is a subprefecture of Tokyo Metropolis, Japan. It is administered by the Bureau Of General Affairs of the Tokyo Metropolitan Government.

It includes the following towns and villages on the Izu Islands:

Ōshima  (town on Izu Ōshima)
Toshima (village on Toshima)
Niijima (village on Niijima and Shikinejima)
Kōzushima (village on Kōzushima)

It covers 141.82 square km and 13,825 people.

History
1900: Founded as Ōshima Island Government Office.
1920: The island halls of Toshima, Niijima (including Shikinejima), Kōzushima, Miyakejima, and Mikurajima were abolished. The island government office takes control of these islands. The branch offices on Miyakejima and Niijima were founded.
1926: Changed to Ōshima Subprefecture.
1943: Miyakejima Branch Office was split as Miyake Subprefecture.

See also

References

External links
Ōshima Island Branch Office Official Website 

Subprefectures in Tokyo
Izu Islands